Merle may refer to:

People
Merle (given name), a given name used by both men and women
Merle (surname), a surname of French origin

Others
Merle (dog coat), a pattern in dogs’ coats
Merle (grape), another name for the wine grape Merlot
Akaflieg München Mü17 Merle, a German glider originally built in 1938 for the 1940 Olympics gliding competition
MS Phocine, a ferry formerly named MS Merle
Merle's Tune, a hymn tune composed by Hal Hopson in 1983
A Crusader fort near Tantura on the coast of Israel
The French name for the common blackbird

See also
Merl (disambiguation)
Merles, a commune in southern France